The following is a list of teams and cyclists that took part in the 2018 Giro d'Italia.

Teams
All 18 UCI WorldTeams were automatically invited and were obliged to attend the race. Four wildcard UCI Professional Continental teams were also selected. Each team is expected to start with eight riders (one less than in the previous year). 
The teams entering the race are:

Cyclists

By starting number

By team

By nationality 
The 176 riders that are competing in the 2018 Giro d'Italia originated from 32 different countries.

References

External links
 

2018 Giro d'Italia
2018